Denis Kramar (born 7 November 1991) is a Slovenian footballer who plays for SC Weiz as a defender.

Club career
Born in Murska Sobota, Kramar graduated from NK Rudar Velenje's youth setup, and made his professional debut on 7 November 2009, coming on as a second-half substitute in a 3–1 away loss against NK Interblock in the Slovenian PrvaLiga. In the summer of 2010 he was loaned to NK Šmartno 1928, appearing regularly with the side and also scoring three goals.

In August 2012 Kramar signed for ND Mura 05, also in the top division. He played in all eight games in the UEFA Europa League, including both ties against the Serie A side Lazio in the play-offs. On 12 March 2013, with the club in severe financial trouble and facing bankruptcy, he moved abroad for the first time in his career, joining Polish Ekstraklasa side Widzew Łódź.

On 24 July, after appearing in only three matches for Widzew, Kramar moved teams and countries again, signing with Enosis Neon Paralimni FC. However, on 7 January 2014 he joined Getafe CF, initially assigned to the reserves in Segunda División B.

On 3 February 2015 Kramar joined Australian A-League club Perth Glory FC on a short term injury replacement loan. He made his debut for the club four days later, playing the entire second half and scoring his side's only in a 3–1 home loss against Sydney FC.

On 23 January 2016 Kramar signed for Bosnian side FK Sarajevo.

References

External links

1991 births
Living people
People from Murska Sobota
Slovenian footballers
Slovenia youth international footballers
Association football defenders
NK Rudar Velenje players
NK Šmartno 1928 players
ND Mura 05 players
Widzew Łódź players
Enosis Neon Paralimni FC players
Getafe CF B players
Úrvalsdeild karla (football) players
Perth Glory FC players
FK Sarajevo players
Ungmennafélagið Víkingur players
SV Lafnitz players
SC Weiz players
Austrian Regionalliga players
Slovenian PrvaLiga players
Ekstraklasa players
Segunda División B players
Premier League of Bosnia and Herzegovina players
A-League Men players
Slovenian expatriate footballers
Slovenian expatriate sportspeople in Poland
Expatriate footballers in Poland
Slovenian expatriate sportspeople in Cyprus
Expatriate footballers in Cyprus
Slovenian expatriate sportspeople in Spain
Expatriate footballers in Spain
Expatriate soccer players in Australia
Expatriate footballers in Bosnia and Herzegovina
Expatriate footballers in Iceland
Slovenian expatriate sportspeople in Austria
Expatriate footballers in Austria
Slovenian expatriate sportspeople in Iceland